Laura Bates  (born 27 August 1986, Oxford) is an English feminist writer. She founded the Everyday Sexism Project website in April 2012. Her first book, Everyday Sexism, was published in 2014.

Biography 

Bates' parents are Diane Elizabeth Bates, a French teacher, and Adrian Keith Bates, a physician. She grew up in the London Borough of Hackney and Taunton, and has an older sister and a younger brother. Her parents divorced when Bates was in her twenties. She attended King's College, Taunton. She read English literature at St John's College, Cambridge, and graduated from the University of Cambridge in 2007. Bates remained in Cambridge for two-and-a-half years as a researcher for the psychologist Susan Quilliam, who was working on an updated edition of The Joy of Sex.

Bates then worked as an actress and a nanny, a period during which she has said she experienced sexism at auditions and found the young girls she was caring for were already preoccupied with their body image.

Everyday Sexism Project 
The Everyday Sexism Project website was founded in 2012. Around the third anniversary of the website, in April 2015, Everyday Sexism had reached 100,000 entries. Bates has said that she has faced abuse online.

Bates' first book Everyday Sexism, based on the project, was published by the London subsidiary of Simon & Schuster in 2014.

Career 
After Everyday Sexism, Bates published several more books about sexism. Bates is a contributor to The Guardian, The Independent and other publications. She is a contributor to the New York–based Women Under Siege Project.

Honours and awards 
 2013: Cosmopolitan magazine's Ultimate New Feminist Award in 2013.
 2014: BBC's 100 women.
 2015: British Empire Medal in the 2015 Birthday Honours for services to gender equality.
 2018: Fellow of the Royal Society of Literature in its "40 Under 40" initiative.
 2020: Honorary Fellow of St John's College, Cambridge.

Personal life 
Bates married Nick Taylor in 2014.

Publications 
 2014: Everyday Sexism: The Project that Inspired a Worldwide Movement, Simon & Schuster 
 2016: Girl Up: Kick Ass, Claim Your Woman Card, and Crush Everyday Sexism, Simon & Schuster 
 2018: Misogynation: The True Scale of Sexism, Simon & Schuster 
 2019: The Burning, Simon & Schuster 
 2020: Men Who Hate Women, Simon & Schuster 
 2022: Fix the System, Not the Women, Simon & Schuster

References

External links 
The Everyday Sexism Project
EverydaySexism on Twitter

1986 births
Living people
21st-century English women writers
21st-century English writers
Alumni of St John's College, Cambridge
BBC 100 Women
English feminist writers
English women non-fiction writers
Fellows of the Royal Society of Literature
Fourth-wave feminism
The Guardian people
People from Hackney Central
writers from Oxford
People educated at King's College, Taunton